The FAI European Aerobatic Championship is an aerobatic competition held biennially, alternating with the World Aerobatic Championship.

Manfred Strößenreuther cup winners

Individual winners

Winners by teams

Bibliography 
 www.fai.org/civa-events/civa-events-calendar-and-results#
 http://www.german-aerobatics.com

See also 
FAI World Aerobatic Championships
Aerobatic maneuver
Competition aerobatics

References

Aerobatic competitions